Centerville High School, is a public high school located in Centerville, Iowa.  It is part of the Centerville Community School District and is the home of the Big Reds and Redettes.

The first graduate was Miss Jennie Drake, the daughter of former Iowa Governor, Francis Marion Drake.

Athletics
The Big Reds and Redettes are members of the South Central Conference, and participate in the following sports:
Football
Cross Country
 Boys' 1979 Class A State Champions
Volleyball
Basketball
 Girls' 2-time State Champions (1935, 1936) 
Wrestling
 1988 Class 2A State Champions 
Golf
Soccer
Tennis
Track and Field
 Boys' 1996 Class 3A State Champions
Baseball
 2-time Class 3A State Champions (1988, 2008)
Softball

References

See also
List of high schools in Iowa

Public high schools in Iowa
Schools in Appanoose County, Iowa